The United States ambassador to San Marino is the official representative of the government of the United States to the government of San Marino. The ambassador is concurrently the ambassador to Italy, while resident in Rome, Italy.

Ambassadors

See also
San Marino – United States relations
Foreign relations of San Marino
Ambassadors of the United States

References

United States Department of State: Background notes on San Marino

External links
 United States Department of State: Chiefs of Mission for San Marino
 United States Department of State: San Marino
 Virtual United States Embassy in Rome

 
San Marino
United States